999 (read in Malay as sembilan sembilan sembilan) is a Malaysian investigative reality television series show (similar to COPS in the United States); which focusing to crimes in the country. The show has aired on TV3 since 3 January 2002 and has aired every Tuesday at 9:00 pm since January 2014. Previously it aired every Thursday at 9:00 pm since it first aired. The host as of 2014 is Hazlin Hussain after Hazlin following Sarah Adiba Yussof in 2017 and Anim Ezati Rizki in 2018. 999 is currently hosted by Sofea Nursolehha Tun beginning 7 April 2020.

Former hosts of the show were Zakiah Anas, Mazidul Akmal Sidek, Halim Din and Omar Abdullah. In its first year, it was one of Malaysia's most watched TV programmes with audiences of over 3 million.

Hosts 
 Zakiah Anas from 2002 to 2009
 Hazlin Hussain from 2010 to 2017
 Sarah Adiba Yussof from 2017 to 2018 
 Anim Ezati Rizki from 1 January 2018 to 31 March 2020
 Sofea Nursolehha Tun 31 March 2020 to present

Reporters
Omar Abdullah - from 2002 to 2005, producer 
Halim Din - from 2002 to 2009,2020/2021
Mazidul Akmal Sidek - from 2002 to 2010
Tun Hizami Hashim - from 2014 until now
Nor Izzati Lockman - From 2016 to 2020
Faizal Murad - from 2017 to 2020
Haziq Hamid - from 2020 to 2021
Haris Farouk Alex - from 2012 until now

2021-now 
Afifah Aminudin 
Aresya Khalim

Guest host
Kamal Effendi Hashim, former police officer and crime analyst (from 2003 to 2006)

Popular culture

the program becomes an appearance in action movie J2:Retribusi starring by Zul Ariffin, Ashraf Sinclair and cameo former 999 host Anim Ezati as herself during end scene and premier Disney Hotstar in 2021, and drama spin off Gerak Khas Undercover aired by TV3 starring Khalida Balqis as Alia in 2021.

References

3.https://13.228.5.5/cover-sinarplus/mengendalikan-program-sensasi-999-sofea-nur-solehha-sentiasa-berhati-hati/

2002 Malaysian television series debuts
Malaysian reality television series
2000s crime television series
2000s Malaysian television series
TV3 (Malaysia) original programming